The Connection is a 1959 play by Jack Gelber. It was first produced by the Living Theatre, directed by Living Theatre co-founder Judith Malina, and designed by co-founder Julian Beck. The play has a play-within-a-play format, with characters Jim Dunn as the "producer" and Jaybird as the "writer" attempting to stage a production about the underbelly of society using "real" addicts. Some of the addicts are jazz musicians. They all (except for the "producer", "writer", and two "photographers") have one thing in common: they are waiting for their drug dealer, their "connection". The dialogue of the characters is interspersed with jazz music. The music for the original production was composed by jazz pianist Freddie Redd.

Original cast
Jim Dunn – Leonard Hicks
Jaybird – Ira Lewis
Leach – Warren Finnerty
Solly – Jerome Raphel
Sam – John McCurry
Ernie – Garry Goodrow
1st Musician – Freddie Redd (composer, piano)
4th Musician – Michael Mattos (bass)
First Photographer – Louis McKenzie
Second Photographer – Jamil Zakkai
2nd Musician – Jackie McLean (alto saxophone)
3rd Musician – Larry Ritchie (drums)
Harry – Henry Proach
Sister Salvation – Barbara Winchester
Cowboy – Carl Lee
Man in audience – Martin Sheen (uncredited)

Original production credits
Written by Jack Gelber
Directed by Judith Malina
Designed by Julian Beck

Other performances of The Connection

Revised Cast, 1961 
Redd's score, new cast 
 Freddie Redd, composer/piano
 Howard McGhee, trumpet
 Tina Brooks (originally Jackie McLean's understudy), tenor saxophone
 Milt Hinton, bass
 Osie Johnson, drums

Touring Cast, 1961/62 
Score by Cecil Payne and Kenny Drew, Conducted by Cecil Payne 
 Cecil Payne, baritone sax
 Clark Terry, trumpet
 Bennie Green, trombone
 Duke Jordan, piano
 Ron Carter, bass
 Charlie Persip, drums

Los Angeles Production 
The score to accompany the Los Angeles production was performed by Dexter Gordon who also played "Number One Musician". He later recorded several pieces from this production for his Blue Note release Dexter Calling... (1961).

Quote (from the liner notes to the Blue Note album):
"Soul Sister," the original that launches the first side is one of the themes Dexter wrote for the score of the Hollywood version of The Connection in which he had an acting, playing, and writing role; it is the equivalent of Freddie Redd's "(Theme for) Sister Salvation"...
"I Want More", the significantly titled Gordon theme that closes the first side, is the West Coast equivalent of "O.D. (Overdose)"...
"Ernie's Theme", is the last of the three themes on this LP from Dexter's Connection score. It parallels "Music Forever".

Awards and honors

1959–60 Village Voice Obie Awards
 Obie Award for Best New Play
 Obie Award for Best All-Around Production
 Obie Award for Best Actor - Warren Finnerty

1959–60 Vernon Rice Awards
 Vernon Rice Award for outstanding achievement in the off-broadway theatre - Jack Gelber

Other
 Grand Prix for Best Play at the Theatre des Nacions, Paris, 1960

Related works
Film adaptation
 The Connection, produced by Lewis M. Allen, directed by Shirley Clarke, 1961. Released on DVD, Jazz Movie Classics/EFORFILMS 2869032

Recordings
 The Music from "The Connection", music composed by Freddie Redd, with Freddie Redd, Jackie McLean, Michael Mattos and Larry Ritchie, February 15, 1960, Blue Note, BLP 4027 (m)/BST 84027 (s). Released on CD, Blue Note 89392.
 Music from the Connection, different recording of the above score, issued as under Howard McGhee, with Tina Brooks, I. Ching (Freddie Redd), Milt Hinton and Osie Johnson
 The Music from "The Connection", rewritten score by Cecil Payne and Kenny Drew, Conducted by Cecil Payne, with Cecil Payne, Clark Terry, Bennie Green, Duke Jordan, Ron Carter and Charlie Persip, Recorded 14, 15, 16 March 1962 - Charlie Parker Records PLP 806 

Other productions
 London, 1960
 European Tour, 1962: Italy, France, Germany, Switzerland, Sweden, Belgium, Denmark, The Netherlands
 London, 1974, at Hampstead Theatre Club with Bill Wallis, John Ratzenberger, Harry Ditson, Mark Russel, Richard Moore, and Philip Hinton. Directed by Michael Rudman
 New York, 1981, with Morgan Freeman as Cowboy
 Chicago, 1992, the inaugural production of A Red Orchid Theatre, featuring Michael Shannon and Guy Van Swearingen
 New York, 2009, 50th Anniversary Production at the Living Theatre, directed by Judith Malina, music director Rene McLean
 Seattle, 2011, Sight by Sound productions, directed by Gavin Reub in The Little Theater

References

 Kenneth Tynan, preface, The Connection, Grove Press, 1960
 Lionel Abel, Partisan Review, Winter, 1960 - "What adds to the play's power is that the characters are so like other people, though in such a different situation from most people."
 Ira Gitler, Liner notes to Blue Note BLP 4027/BST 84027

Further reading 

  Previously published as

External links
 New York University's Fales Library and Special Collections Guide to the Jack Gelber Papers

1959 plays
Obie Award-winning plays
American plays adapted into films
Theatre about drugs